Red Bank is an unincorporated community and census-designated place (CDP) in Lexington County, South Carolina, United States. The population was 9,617 at the 2010 census, up from 8,811 at the 2000 census. It is part of the Columbia, South Carolina Metropolitan Statistical Area.

Geography
Red Bank is located just east of the center of Lexington County at  (33.932005, -81.230211). It is bordered to the north by Lexington, the county seat, and to the south by the White Knoll CDP. South Carolina Highway 6 (S. Lake Drive) is the main road through town, leading north  to the center of Lexington and south  to Edmund. Platt Springs Road (South Carolina Highway 602 east of SC-6) forms the border between Red Bank and White Knoll. Highway 602 leads northeast  to West Columbia. 

Red Bank Creek, an east-flowing tributary of Congaree Creek and part of the Congaree River watershed, passes just south of the original town center. Crystal Lake and Saxe-Gotha Millpond are two small reservoirs impounding the creek.

Demographics

2020 census

As of the 2020 United States census, there were 10,924 people, 4,137 households, and 3,035 families residing in the CDP.

2000 census
As of the census of 2000, there were 8,811 people, 3,281 households, and 2,480 families residing in the CDP. The population density was 740.6 people per square mile (285.9/km2). There were 3,498 housing units at an average density of 294.0/sq mi (113.5/km2). The racial makeup of the CDP was 88.74% White, 8.84% African American, 0.35% Native American, 0.49% Asian, 0.03% Pacific Islander, 0.93% from other races, and 0.61% from two or more races. Hispanic or Latino of any race were 1.90% of the population.

There were 3,281 households, out of which 43.4% had children under the age of 18 living with them, 58.6% were married couples living together, 12.8% had a female householder with no husband present, and 24.4% were non-families. 19.4% of all households were made up of individuals, and 3.6% had someone living alone who was 65 years of age or older. The average household size was 2.68 and the average family size was 3.09.

In the CDP, the population was spread out, with 29.8% under the age of 18, 7.6% from 18 to 24, 37.2% from 25 to 44, 20.3% from 45 to 64, and 5.1% who were 65 years of age or older. The median age was 32 years. For every 100 females, there were 93.1 males. For every 100 females age 18 and over, there were 92.6 males.

The median income for a household in the CDP was $42,072, and the median income for a family was $50,838. Males had a median income of $36,347 versus $26,016 for females. The per capita income for the CDP was $18,664. About 5.8% of families and 7.9% of the population were below the poverty line, including 11.1% of those under age 18 and 7.2% of those age 65 or over.

References

Census-designated places in Lexington County, South Carolina
Census-designated places in South Carolina
Columbia metropolitan area (South Carolina)